Mordechai Omer (April 1941 - 10 June 2011) was an Israeli art historian and museum administrator who served as Director of the Tel Aviv Museum of Art.

Born in Haifa, he was educated at the Hebrew University of Jerusalem (BA Art History, 1961), Columbia University under Meyer Schapiro (MA Art History, 1968) and the University of East Anglia (PhD, 1976) where his doctoral dissertation was on the biblical subjects of J M W Turner supervised by John Gage.

Omer lived in the United States from 1967–72, studying and working at the Museum of Modern Art New York. He lived in Hampstead, London 1972 - 75 whilst completing his doctorate.

He held a professorship in Art History at the University of Tel Aviv from 1986 and was also head of the University’s Museum Studies Program.   Omer was guest curator for the Saõ Paulo Biennial (1987 and 1989) and the Commissioner of the Israel Pavilion at the Venice Biennale (2003). He served as Director and Chief Curator of the Tel Aviv Museum of Art from 1995 until his death in 2011 and was instrumental in the commissioning of the Herta and Paul Amir Building.

Omer died from cancer after a short period of illness and was buried in Har Hamenuchot cemetery, Jerusalem. Tel Aviv Mayor Ron Huldai was among those who delivered eulogies

Publications
 J.M.W. Turner and the Romantic Vision of the Holy Land and the Bible McMullen Museum of Art, Boston College, Boston 1996 
 Turner and the Bible The Ashmolean Museum, Oxford, 1981, 
 Turner und die DichtkunstBayerische Staatsgemäldesammlung, München, 1976  
 Turner And The Poets: Engravings And Watercolours From His Later Period 
 Dina Recanati Passage 2001, Tel Aviv Museum, Israel ISBN B000OK6BBI
 Avigdor Arikha: Drawings  Tell Aviv Museum,1998, Israel
 Hiriya In the Museum Artists and Architect Tel Aviv Museum,1999 
 Adam Berg, Adam Berg (Illustrations), Mordechai Omer (Text), 2008, Tel Aviv 
 Enzo Cucchi original title Enzo Cucchi: The Tel Aviv Mosaic Charta 2000, Tel Aviv, 
 Universo y Magia De Joan Ponc Ediciones Poligrafa, Barcelona, 1971

References

1941 births
2011 deaths
Hebrew University of Jerusalem alumni
Columbia University alumni
Alumni of the University of East Anglia
Academic staff of Tel Aviv University
Directors of museums in Israel
Deaths from cancer in Israel